Eugnosta synaetera is a species of moth of the family Tortricidae. It is found in Brazil (Santa Catarina, Goias).

References

Moths described in 1994
Eugnosta